The sharp-tailed streamcreeper (Lochmias nematura) is a passerine bird of South America belonging to the family Furnariidae, the ovenbirds. It is the only member of the genus Lochmias. The species is also known as the streamside streamcreeper.

Description
This bird is about 6 in (15 cm) long, with a short tail and a long, thin, slightly curved bill. The plumage is dark brown, densely spotted white on the underparts. There is a white stripe over the eye and the tail is blackish.

The first Guyana specimen, collected on July 24, 2004, had a smooth ovary measuring 4x3 mm, a bursa of Fabricius measuring 3x3 mm, and an unossified skull (as often seen in Furnarioidea even when adult).

The song is an accelerating trill, lasting for about five seconds.

Ecology
It inhabits dense undergrowth near streams, particularly in humid premontane and montane forest, foraging on the ground for insects and other invertebrates. It usually occurs alone or in pairs and is often shy and hard to see. The nest is ball-shaped with a side-entrance and is built on the ground.

Due to its extremely wide range, the sharp-tailed streamcreeper is not considered a threatened species by the IUCN.

Subspecies
There are six subspecies which differ little:
Lochmias nematura castanonotus - south-east Venezuela
Lochmias nematura chimantae - southern Venezuela
Lochmias nematura nelsoni - Panama (eastern Darién)
Lochmias nematura nematura - south-east Brazil, north-east Argentina, eastern Paraguay, Uruguay.
Lochmias nematura obscuratus - Peru, Bolivia
Lochmias nematura sororius - Colombia, Ecuador, northern Venezuela, north-east Peru
The species has long been suspected to have at least a temporary presence in Guyana. However, this was only proven recently, with sight records in the Pakaraima Mountains since 2002 and a specimen (LSUMZ 175389) taken in 2004. These birds probably belong to one of the Venezuelan populations, but it is not yet known to which.

Footnotes

References
 de L. Fávaro, Fernando; dos Anjos, Luiz; Lopes, Edson V.; Mendonça, Luciana B. & Volpato, Graziele H. (2006): Efeito do gradiente altitudinal/latitudinal sobre espécies de aves florestais da família Furnariidae na Bacia do Rio Tibagi, Paraná, Brasil [Effect of altitudinal/latitudinal gradient about forest ovenbirds species (Aves: Furnariidae) in the Tibagi river basin, Paraná, Brazil]. [Portuguese with English abstract] Revista Brasileira de Zoologia 23(1): 261–266.  PDF fulltext
 Remsen, V. (2003) Family Furnariidae (Ovenbirds). in del Hoyo J., Elliott A. & Christie D.A. (2003) Handbook of the Birds of the World. Volume 8. Broadbills to Tapaculos Lynx Edicions, Barcelona 
 O'Shea, B.J.; Milensky, Christopher M.; Claramunt, Santiago; Schmidt, Brian K.; Gebhard, Christina A.; Schmitt, C. Gregory & Erskine, Kristine T. (2007): New records for Guyana, with description of the voice of Roraiman Nightjar Caprimulgus whitelyi. Bull. B.O.C. 127(2): 118–128. PDF fulltext
 Salaman, Paul G.W.; Stiles, F. Gary; Bohórquez, Clara Isabel; Álvarez-R., Mauricio; Umaña, Ana María; Donegan, Thomas M. & Cuervo, Andrés M. (2002): New and noteworthy bird records from the east slope of the andes of Colombia. Caldasia 24(1): 157–189. PDF fulltext

Further reading
 Meyer de Schauensee, Rodolphe & Phelps, William H. (1978): A Guide to the Birds of Venezuela. Princeton University Press.
 Ridgely, Robert S. & Gwynne, John A. (1989) A Guide to the Birds of Panama with Costa Rica, Nicaragua and Honduras. Princeton University Press.

External links
 
 Photos, videos and observations at Cornell Lab of Ornithologys Birds of the World
 Sounds on the xeno canto collection

sharp-tailed streamcreeper
Birds of the Northern Andes
Birds of Venezuela
Birds of Brazil
Birds of the Atlantic Forest
Birds of Uruguay
sharp-tailed streamcreeper